Buchli is a surname. Notable people with the surname include:

Jakob Buchli (1876–1945), Swiss engineer
Buchli drive, locomotive transmission system invented by Jakob Buchli
James Buchli (born 1945), American engineer and aviator
Milton S. Buchli (1910–2003), American politician